Indaparapeo is a municipality in the Mexican state of Michoacán, located approximately  east of the state capital of Morelia.

Geography
It borders the municipalities of Zinapécuaro to the north, Queréndaro to the east, Tzitzio to the south, Charo to the southwest, and Álvaro Obregón to the northwest.

As of 2009, the land in Indaparapeo consists of farmland (41%), temperate forest (41%), grassland (9%), rainforest (5%), and urban areas (3%). About 95% of the entire municipality is located in the Lerma River basin, while the southernmost part is drained by the Purungueo River, a tributary of the Cutzamala River.

Indaparapeo has a temperate climate with rain in the summer.

History
In the Purépecha language, Indaparapeo has been translated to mean "place of games" or "place of victory in combat"; the latter would appear to be a reference to the Tarascans defeating the Aztecs. Prior to Spanish contact, Indaparapeo was inhabited by the Matlatzinca people, who were allies of the Tarascans.

Indaparapeo was one of the 61 municipalities initially created in Michoacán in 1831. Its original extent has been reduced by the creation of several municipalities from its territory, namely Queréndaro in 1921, Álvaro Obregón in 1930 and Tzitzio in 1936.

Administration
The municipal government comprises a president, a councillor (Spanish: síndico), and seven trustees (regidores), four elected by relative majority and three by proportional representation. The current president of the municipality is María Teresa Pérez Romero.

Demographics
In the 2010 Mexican Census, the municipality of Indaparapeo recorded a population of 16,427 inhabitants living in 3791 households. The 2015 Intercensal Survey estimated a population of 16,990 inhabitants in Indaparapeo.

There are 39 localities in the municipality, of which two are classified as urban:
 the municipal seat also known as Indaparapeo, which recorded a population of 6791 inhabitants in the 2010 Census; and

Economy
Important economic activities in Indaparapeo include agriculture and brickmaking.

References

Municipalities of Michoacán
1831 establishments in Mexico
States and territories established in 1831